Since the founding of the Industrial Workers of the World (IWW), songs have played a large part in spreading the message of the One Big Union. The songs are preserved in the Little Red Songbook.

Definition
The Little Red Songbook (1909), also known as I.W.W. Songs or Songs of the Industrial Workers of the World, subtitled (in some editions) Songs to Fan the Flames of Discontent, is a compilation of tunes, hymns, and songs used by the Industrial Workers of the World (I.W.W.) to help build morale, promote solidarity, and lift the spirits of the working-class during the Labor Movement.

History
The Little Red Songbook was first published by a committee of Spokane, Washington IWW members in 1909. It was originally called Songs of the Workers, on the Road, in the Jungles, and in the Shops—Songs to Fan the Flames of Discontent. It includes songs written by Joe Hill, Harry McClintock (Spellbinder), Ralph Chaplin, T-Bone Slim, and others. The early editions contain many of the most well-known labor songs, such as "The Red Flag," "The Internationale," "The Preacher and the Slave," and "Solidarity Forever." Thirty-six editions were published between 1909 and 1995.

A Canadian I.W.W. Songbook, compiled and edited by Jerzy (George) Dymny, featuring 41 songs with a Canadian slant, was published in 1990.

An edition commemorating the centennial of the IWW's founding in 1905 was published in 2005. The latest edition of the Little Red Songbook was printed in 2010.

The 190 different songs included in the Little Red Songbook between 1909 and 1973 are collected and annotated in The Big Red Songbook, edited by Archie Green, David Roediger, and Franklin Rosemont and published in 2007.

Bibliography
 IWW Songs - to Fan the Flames of Discontent: A Reprint of the Nineteenth Edition (1923) of the Famous Little Red Song Book. Chicago: Charles H. Kerr Publishing Co., 2003. 
 Songs of the Workers to Fan the Flames of Discontent: The Little Red Songbook.  Limited Centenary Concert Edition.  Philadelphia: Industrial Workers of the World, June 2005.
Archie Green, David Roediger, Franklin Rosemont, and Salvatore Salerno, eds., The Big Red Songbook.  Chicago: Charles H. Kerr Publishing Co., 2007.  
 Canadian I.W.W. Songbook, compiled and edited by Jerzy (George) Dymny.  Toronto, Ontario: Industrial Workers of the World, May 1, 1990.

References

External links

 
 Downloadable versions on The Internet Archive
 Text of the songbook
 Archie Green interviewed on National Public Radio about The Big Red Songbook

Song books
History of labor relations in the United States
Industrial Workers of the World publications
1909 books
Trade union songs
Socialist songs